The 1978 ARFU Asian Rugby Championship was the 6th edition  of the tournament, and was played in Kuala Lumpur. The 7 teams were divided in two pool, with final between the winner of both of them. Japan won the tournament.

Tournament

Pool A

Pool B

Finals

Third Place Final

First Place Final

References

1978
1978 rugby union tournaments for national teams
International rugby union competitions hosted by Malaysia
rugby union